Connellsville Armory is a historic National Guard armory located at Connellsville, Fayette County, Pennsylvania.  It was designed by Pittsburgh architects W.G. Wilkins Co.  It was built in 1907, and consists of a two-story administration section with a rear one-story drill hall in a "T"-plan.  The 55 foot by 110 foot building is constructed of brick on a coursed ashlar foundation.  It has a number of Tudor Revival / Late Gothic Revival style details including a two-story entrance arch, a gabled parapet, and brick polygonal towers.

It was added to the National Register of Historic Places in 1991.

References

Armories on the National Register of Historic Places in Pennsylvania
Gothic Revival architecture in Pennsylvania
Tudor Revival architecture in Pennsylvania
Infrastructure completed in 1907
Buildings and structures in Fayette County, Pennsylvania
1907 establishments in Pennsylvania
National Register of Historic Places in Fayette County, Pennsylvania